Aimie Rocci (née Clydesdale; born 21 September 1993) is an Australian basketball player who currently plays for the Southside Flyers in the Women's National Basketball League.

Professional career

WNBL
Rocci made her Women's National Basketball League debut in 2010, for the Dandenong Rangers. She has since remained a consistent member of their roster. She was a member of the Rangers, 2011–12 championship winning team. In May 2016, Rocci was re-signed by the Rangers for two more seasons.  Rocci will head to South Australia for the 2017–18 season, after signing with the Adelaide Lightning for two seasons.

National team
Rocci was a consistent member of the Australian's women's junior teams. She represented Australia at the inaugural FIBA Under-17 World Championship for Women in Toulouse, France where Australia placed seventh. She was then named to the Gems squad and helped them take home the Gold at the Oceania Under-18 Championship and qualify for the World Championship the following year in Chile. Rocci was once again named to this squad, where they were narrowly defeated in the Bronze medal match by Brazil, finishing the tournament placed fourth.

Personal life
She was a student at Monash University, Endeavour Hills, Victoria, Australia, 2015-2018.

References

1993 births
Living people
Australian women's basketball players
Dandenong Rangers players
Universiade medalists in basketball
Universiade gold medalists for Australia
Guards (basketball)
Medalists at the 2017 Summer Universiade
People from the City of Greater Dandenong
Sportswomen from Victoria (Australia)
Basketball players from Melbourne
Monash University alumni